Bang Khun Kong is one of the nine subdistricts (tambon) of Bang Kruai District, in Nonthaburi Province, Thailand. The subdistrict is bounded by (clockwise from north) Bang Krang, Bang Khanun, Maha Sawat and Bang Khu Wiang subdistricts. In 2020 it had a total population of 11,171 people.

Administration

Central administration
The subdistrict is subdivided into 6 administrative villages (muban).

Local administration
The whole area of the subdistrict is covered by Bang Khun Kong Subdistrict Administrative Organization.

References

External links
Website of Bang Khun Kong Subdistrict Administrative Organization

Tambon of Nonthaburi province
Populated places in Nonthaburi province